Ideal Higher Secondary School, Dharmagiri is a privately owned school situated at Cherekkad, near Karipur in Malappuram district, Kerala state. Run by Vengara Islamic Charitable Trust, it provides education up to class 12 in Kerala state syllabus along with religious moral studies. The school is situated in a scenic village near Karipur International Airport.

References 

Schools in Malappuram district
High schools and secondary schools in Kerala